Auto-Trail is a motorhome manufacturer, set up by Bill Boasman and Barry Holmes in 1982. Fast forward to 2022 and the company now employs more than 200 staff members at their manufacturing site in Grimsby, North-East Lincolnshire. Auto-Trail is now the UK's leading motorhome manufacturer, offering a wide range of campervans and larger coachbuilt leisure vehicles.

History 
After both working at Astral, Boasman and Holmes worked together at Cosalt in Grimsby, and together built up the caravan division known as Humber Caravan Co. alongside Len Funnell. This caravan division was then renamed Abbey Caravan Company. Boasman left in 1971 to begin working at Mustang.

In 1982, after being inspired by American RVs, Boasman created the first coachbuilt Auto-Trail motorhome, the Auto-Trail Cheyenne on the Peugeot 504.

Auto-Trail's signature cream-coloured coachwork with broad maroon stripes was the most popular in the 1980s, built on a Mercedes chassis. By the end of the decade, green and blue variants were catching up in popularity.

The early 1990s found the Mohawk and Cheyenne models becoming strong sellers. The Cheyenne range was originally a budget build for the hire fleets, but it became a surprise hit with private buyers, so Auto-Trail developed the Rico luxury pack and Sport range.

In terms of size, the smallest motorhome built by Auto-Trail in the 90s was the original Tracker, based on a Fiat Scudo with Al-Ko chassis extensions. At the other end of the scale, the biggest motorhome was built on a Mercedes lorry chassis.

In 1994, the award-winning Cree was the first Auto-Trail to feature and end changing room. An open layout and modern furnishings helped it to find favour with couples wanting the magic carpet travel that the Volkswagen's all-independent suspension provided.

Auto-Trail was bought out by A.B.I Caravans although Auto-Trail remained at its Grimsby factory. ABI went out of business in 1998 and Auto-Trail was sold to the Italian Ci Group, owned by the larger Trigano Group in 1999.

Fast forward to 2007 and dated interiors were updated to include smart, modern aircraft-style locker doors and a permanent bed.

In 2013, Auto-Trail launched their V-Line range of campervans, featuring a panoramic roof light, integrated rain run-off channels, a 100W solar panel and flush fitting, double-glazed privacy windows.

A new coachbuilt range called the Imala launched in 2014; an affordable range of motorhomes that didn't compromise on build quality or specification. The range is names after the native American word for a highly disciplined newborn. Five models are in the Imala range, each built on the new generation Fiat Ducato chassis.

2015 saw the beginning of big change for Auto-Trail when they announced a multi-million pound expansion for their Grimsby site. Groundworks on the expansion project started in January 2016 and the final fit-out of the new production facility was finished over the summer production break the same year. The new production lines are more efficient and environmentally friendly, allowing Auto-Trail to produce almost double the number of vehicles each year.

Auto-Trail added the Tribute range into the main Auto-Trail line-up in 2017 after manufacturing moved from Italy to the company's main premises in Grimsby.

In 2020, Auto-Trail launched their first ever elevating roof compact motorhome, the Adventure. This van has two model options with high-quality engineering and interior design.

Current Ranges 
Auto-Trail continue to produce both van conversion and coachbuilt motorhomes.

 Expedition
 V-Line 
 Adventure
 F-Line
 Imala
 Tracker
 Frontier
 Grande Frontier

References 

British companies established in 1982
Car manufacturers of the United Kingdom